Little Miss Nobody is a 1923 British silent comedy film directed by Wilfred Noy and starring Flora le Breton, John Stuart and Ben Field.

Plot
The caretaker of a Scottish castle tries to trick his aunt into believing that some of the guests are aristocrats.

Cast
 Flora le Breton as Miss Nobody  
 John Stuart as Guy Cheviot  
 Ben Field as Potter  
 Gladys Jennings as Lady Violet  
 Sidney Paxton as Dominie 
 Eva Westlake as Lady Stilton 
 Alfred Clark as Earl of Cripplegate 
 Donald Searle as Gussie  
 Aubrey Fitzgerald as Jock  
 James Reardon as Manager

References

Bibliography
 Low, Rachael. The History of the British Film 1918-1929. George Allen & Unwin, 1971.

External links
 

1923 films
1923 comedy films
British comedy films
British silent feature films
Films directed by Wilfred Noy
British films based on plays
Films set in Scotland
British black-and-white films
1920s English-language films
1920s British films
Silent comedy films